Achike is both a given name and a surname meaning "Give praise to The Lord." Notable people with the name include:

Achike Udenwa (born 1948), Nigerian politician
Anthonia Ifeyinwa Achike, Nigerian agricultural economist
Larry Achike (born 1975), English triple jumper

Igbo-language surnames